Randleman High School is a high school in the Randolph County Schools system in the U.S. state of North Carolina.

Overview 
Randleman High School is a high school in the Randolph County School District.  The current campus was opened in 1974.

Athletics 
Randleman High School's mascot is the Tiger. They play in the NCHSAA's 2A division.  The Tigers' football team won 3 consecutives state 2A championships from 1981 to 1983.  The 1983 team, led by All-State running back Tony Goss, finished in USA TODAY's final Top 25 poll.

The Tigers won the NCHSAA 2A state title in baseball in 2011, 2021, and 2022. They were also the 2A state runner-up in 2019.

Notable alumni
 Nathan Buttke, stock car racing driver
 Antonio Goss, American football coach and former NFL linebacker
 Dale Inman, former NASCAR crew chief
 Dallas McPherson, former MLB third baseman
 Kyle Petty, former NASCAR driver and current racing commentator
 Maurice Petty, former NASCAR crew chief and engine builder for Petty Enterprises
 Richard Petty, former seven-time NASCAR champion who had a total of 200 Cup Series wins

References

Public high schools in North Carolina
Schools in Randolph County, North Carolina